The Paul Mellon Professorship of American History is a senior professorship at the University of Cambridge.  It was established in 1980 with funds from Paul Mellon family fortune and has been held by several notable American, British, and Canadian academics and public intellectuals since its creation.

The position is sufficiently endowed so as to be a permanent academic post at the University of Cambridge. The Paul Mellon Professor of American History serves both as a scholar and as a cross-cultural leader, advancing and deepening US-British academic and diplomatic connections. As of 2016, the Paul Mellon Professor of American History is held by Dr. Gary Gerstle at the University of Cambridge.

List of Paul Mellon Professors of American History

 1982–1990 Charlotte Erickson
 1992–2014 Tony Badger
 2014– Gary Gerstle

References

American History, Mellon, Paul
School of the Humanities and Social Sciences, University of Cambridge
American History, Mellon, Paul
1980 establishments in England